The 7th Mechanized Infantry Brigade "Sarantaporos" is a mechanized infantry brigade of the Hellenic Army, headquartered in Lykofos, Western Thrace and subordinated to the 12th Mechanized Infantry Division.

Structure 
7th Mechanized Infantry Brigade "Sarantaporos"
 HQ Company (ΙΣΤ)
 7th Signal Company (7 ΛΔΒ)
 7th Engineer Company (7 ΛΜΧ)
 7th Armored Battalion (7 ΕΜΑ)
 526th Mechanized Infantry Battalion (526 M/K ΤΠ)
 641st Mechanized Infantry Battalion (641 M/K ΤΠ)
 642nd Mechanized Infantry Battalion (642 M/K ΤΠ)
 561st Mechanized Infantry Battalion (561 M/K ΤΠ)
 131st Self Propelled Artillery Battalion (131 Μ Α/K ΠΒ)
 7th Antitank Company (7 ΛΑΤ)
 7th Support Battalion (7 ΤΥΠ)

References

Mechanized infantry brigades of Greece
Western Thrace